, also romanized as Kampyō was a  after Ninna and before Shōtai. This period spanned the years from April 889 through April 898.

Change of era
 February 4, 889 : The new era name was created to mark an event or series of events.  The previous era ended and the new one commenced in Ninna 5, on the 27th day of the 4th month of 889.

Events of the Kanpyō era
 889 (Kanpyō 1, 10th month):  The former-Emperor Yōzei was newly attacked by the mental illness. Yōzei would enter the palace and address courtiers he would meet with the greatest rudeness. He became increasingly furious.  He garroted women with the strings of musical instruments and then threw the bodies into a lake.  While riding on horseback, he directed his mount to run over people.  Sometimes he simply disappeared into the mountains where he chased wild boars and red deer.
 August 4, 897 (Kanpyō 9, 3rd day of the 7th month):  In the 10th year of Uda-tennōs reign (宇多天皇10年), Emperor Uda abdicated; and his eldest son received the succession (senso).
 August 6, 897 (Kanpyō 9, 5th day of the 7th month): Emperor Daigo formally acceded to the throne (sokui).

Notes

References
 Brown, Delmer M. and Ichirō Ishida, eds. (1979).  Gukanshō: The Future and the Past. Berkeley: University of California Press. ;  OCLC 251325323
 Nussbaum, Louis-Frédéric and Käthe Roth. (2005).  Japan encyclopedia. Cambridge: Harvard University Press. ;  OCLC 58053128
 Titsingh, Isaac. (1834). Nihon Ōdai Ichiran; ou,  Annales des empereurs du Japon.  Paris: Royal Asiatic Society, Oriental Translation Fund of Great Britain and Ireland. OCLC 5850691
 Varley, H. Paul. (1980). A Chronicle of Gods and Sovereigns: Jinnō Shōtōki of Kitabatake Chikafusa. New York: Columbia University Press.  ;  OCLC 6042764

External links
 National Diet Library, "The Japanese Calendar" -- historical overview plus illustrative images from library's collection

Japanese eras